Ann Stepan (September 27, 1943 – April 17, 2015) was an American politician from Illinois.

Stepan served the 7th district in the Illinois House of Representatives from 1991 to 1993. She married Paul Stepan, a real estate developer, in 1965, shortly after her graduation from Barat College. Stepan died of lymphoma, at her home in Beverly Shores, Indiana on April 17, 2015. Her husband died in 2013.

References

1943 births
2015 deaths
Politicians from Chicago
Women state legislators in Illinois
Democratic Party members of the Illinois House of Representatives
Deaths from lymphoma
Deaths from cancer in Indiana
Barat College alumni
21st-century American women